In abstract algebra, multiplicity theory concerns the multiplicity of a module M at an ideal I (often a maximal ideal)

The notion of the multiplicity of a module is a generalization of the degree of a projective variety. By Serre's intersection formula, it is linked to an intersection multiplicity in the intersection theory.

The main focus of the theory is to detect and measure a singular point of an algebraic variety (cf. resolution of singularities). Because of this aspect, valuation theory, Rees algebras and integral closure are intimately connected to multiplicity theory.

Multiplicity of a module 
Let R be a positively graded ring such that R is finitely generated as an R0-algebra and R0 is Artinian. Note that R has finite Krull dimension d. Let M be a finitely generated R-module and FM(t) its Hilbert–Poincaré series. This series is a rational function of the form

where  is a polynomial. By definition, the multiplicity of M is 

The series may be rewritten 

where r(t) is a polynomial. Note that  are the coefficients of the Hilbert polynomial of M expanded in binomial coefficients. We have

As Hilbert–Poincaré series are additive on exact sequences, the multiplicity is additive on exact sequences of modules of the same dimension.

The following theorem, due to Christer Lech, gives a priori bounds for multiplicity.

See also 
Dimension theory (algebra)
j-multiplicity
Hilbert–Samuel multiplicity
Hilbert–Kunz function
Normally flat ring

References

Theorems in ring theory